Henry Grant may refer to:
Henry Grant (photographer) (1907–2004), British freelance photographer
Henry Grant (British Army officer) (1848–1919)

Henry R. Grant, college football player at Harvard University
Hugo Gutmann (1880–1962), later known as Henry G. Grant, German-Jewish veteran of World War I and Adolf Hitler's superior officer

See also
Harry Grant (disambiguation)